Mark Sherman (born April 17, 1957) is a jazz vibraphonist, pianist, drummer, producer, arranger, author, and classical percussionist.

Sherman has performed for some of the world's top orchestral conductors including Leonard Bernstein, Sir Georg Solti, Zubin Mehta and Herbert Von Karajan, in Jazz as a leader and sideman with Kenny Barron, Peggy Lee, Wynton Marsalis, Joe Lovano, Michael Brecker,  Larry Coryell and many more. He worked in Broadway musicals, and has been one of the most in-demand studio musicians, appearing on more than two dozen film and Broadway soundtracks including The Lion King.  He has worked as a sideman for pop artists Michael Bolton, Natalie Cole,  and Michael McDonald.

Sherman's song "Changes in My Life" became a cult hit in Asia with YouTube videos that earned more than 80 million views.

He is on the faculty of The Juilliard School,  New Jersey City University  and the New York Jazz Workshop. He produces records under his Miles High Records label and publishes music books through his Miles High Music Books subsidiary.

Early life 

Sherman was born in New York City. His mother, Edith Gordon, was a Juilliard-trained soprano who performed with the Cleveland Symphony Orchestra and the Boston Symphony Orchestra. Sherman grew up around opera and studied classical piano as a child.

Education 

Sherman attended The High School of Music and Art in Manhattan in 1975, where he met and performed with many future Jazz musicians including bassist Marcus Miller, Saxophonist Bob Franceschini, guitarist Bobby Broom. He went on to study classical percussion at Juilliard under Saul Goodman, who played in the New York Philharmonic for 50 years. Sherman performed in ensembles under the direction of Leonard Bernstein, Sir Georg Solti, Zubin Mehta and Herbert Von Karajan. Sherman attended Juilliard at the same time as Wynton Marsalis, with whom he jammed regularly. During the course of his career, Sherman also studied with Elvin Jones, Justin Diciocco, Roland Hanna, Jaki Byard, Buster Bailey, and Rohland Kohloff, among others.

Professional career

1970s 

While still in his teens, Sherman played drums in a trio with pianist Kenny Kirkland. Later, Sherman introduced Kirkland to Wynton Marsalis, who would go on to hire Kirkland for his own band.

In 1978, at age 21, Sherman began working on Broadway and in New York's active studio scene, playing percussion, piano, drums and vibraphone.

1980s 

Sherman released his first album, Fulcrum Point featuring Mark Gould, Delmar Brown, Rael Wesley Grant and Kenwood Denard, on Unisphere records in 1980. This recording turned out to be an unknown fusion classic.

He spent a lot of his time in the studio in the 1980s, working on commercial jingles. Pianist Mike Renzi took him under his wing, connecting him with Peggy Lee and other singers. Sherman performed with Lee, Tony Bennett, Mel Torme, Lena Horne and Ruth Brown.

In 1986, after being recommended by Wynton Marsalis, Sherman signed to Columbia Records and released his major label debut, A New Balance. Sherman also played on albums by Joe Beck, Maureen McGovern and Peggy Lee.

1990s 

Sherman continued to perform with Peggy Lee in the early 1990s, appearing on albums by Lee in 1990 and 1993. He also began a seven-year playing relationship with Larry Coryell, producing and performing on Coryell's albums I'll Be Over You (1994) and Sketches of Coryell (1996).

During most of the decade, Sherman was an active studio musician, contributing to albums by Rodney Jones, Gloria Lynne, Michael Bolton, Julian Coryell, LaVerne Butler, Ruth Brown and Maureen McGovern, as well as playing on many film and Broadway soundtracks, including Armageddon, The Lion King, Hercules, and the Broadway versions of Footloose and Kiss of the Spider Woman.

In 1997, Sherman reemerged as a leader playing vibraphone. He also formed Miles High Records, releasing High Rolling in 1998 and Spiral Staircase in 1999.

2000s 

Sherman ended his run with Larry Coryell at the start of the decade, having appearing on three of Coryell's recordings, as well as producing two of them. "It's All Over You" CTI, and "Sketches Of Coryell" (Shanachie records), and 2000 recording New High(High Note). In addition Coryell recorded 10 of Mark's tunes on these CD's. Mark also continued his active career as a sideman, recording with Capathia Jenkins, Jennifer Holliday, Lena Horne, Ann Hampton Callaway, Tony Bennett, Liza Minnelli and many others. He appeared on more than a dozen film and Broadway soundtracks, including The Last Mimzy, Failure To Launch, Miss Congeniality, Miss Congeniality 2: Armed and Fabulous, The Alamo and Two Weeks Notice.

Sherman continued to release his own albums on Miles High Records: The Motive Series (2004, featuring Michael Brecker), One Step Closer (2005, featuring Joe Lovano), Family First (2007), and Live At The Bird’s Eye (2008). Sherman was selected as the winner in the Rising Star (Vibes) category in the Down Beat magazine critics poll in 2007-2015

2010s 

Sherman has released several albums so far this decade, including "Interplay" (2015, Chesky Records with NEA Jazz Master Kenny Barron, Good Rhythm Good Vibes (2010), Explorations In Space And Time (2011, Chesky Records), Live At Chorus (2012), The LA Sessions (2012)  and THEM (2013).  He recorded as a sideman with Dan Block as well as with Rodney Jones, Tim Horner, and Tim Hegarty.

Sherman has performed live in New York at top clubs like Dizzy's Club Coca-Cola, Smalls, and the Kitano, and in Europe with his Mark Sherman 4tet composed of some of the top performers in modern Jazz including Carl Allen and Kenny Barron in the US and with the Mark Sherman 4tet Europa  Antonio Farao, In 2013-2014 a band with the great Bob Franceschini "Project THEM" toured Europe 3 times with the CD release in 2013.

He produced and performed on Laura Perlman's debut 2016 release "Precious Moments" on his Miles High Records label and arranged all but two of the tracks, the latter being done by GRAMMY winning pianist Bill Cunliffe, who also performed on the album along with bassist Chris Colangelo, and drummer Joe LaBarbera.

Educational career

Sherman is currently on the faculty of The Juilliard School,  his alma mater, as well as New Jersey City University  and the New York Jazz Workshop. Sherman is an instructor in the Juilliard jazz program since 2008.

In 2015, he wrote his first book "Skills for the Poetic Language of Jazz Improvisation, with School and Career Guidance" (Miles High Music Books), which was one of the first music education books to synthesize both instruction in performance, and in developing a professional career path as a working musician.

Honors and accolades

In 2010, he was selected as a Jazz Ambassador for the United States Department of State and Jazz at Lincoln Center.

Sherman has been chosen on the Downbeat Magazine Critics' Poll as one of the top jazz vibraphonists in the world for more than ten years.

Discography

As leader/co-leader 
 Fulcrum Point (Unisphere, 1980)
 A New Balance (CBS, 1986)
 High Rollin (Miles High, 1998)
 Spiral Staircase (Miles High, 1999)
 The Motive Series (Miles High, 2004) featuring Michael Brecker
 One Step Closer (Miles High, 2005) featuring Joe Lovano
 Family First (Miles High, 2007)
 Live at the Bird's Eye (Miles High, 2008)
 Live at Sweet Rhythm NYC (DVD, Miles High, 2010)
 Good Rhythm Good Vibes (Miles High, 2010)
 Explorations in Space and Time (Chesky, 2011) featuring Lenny White and Jamey Haddad
 Live at Chorus (Miles High, 2012)
 The L.A. Sessions (Miles High, 2012)
 Them (Miles High, 2013)
 Interplay with Kenny Barron (Chesky, 2015)
 Life Cycle (Ropeadope, 2018) VENTURE with Mike Clark, Chase Baird and Felix Pastorius
 My Other Voice (Miles High Records, 2019) featuring Vincent Herring, Nana Sakamoto and Dan Chmielinski, Ray Drummond and Carl Allen
 Bright Light (The Audiofile Society, 2022) featuring Joe Magnarelli, Dean Johnson and [[Tim Horner (drummer)

As sideman
 Joe Beck, Back to Beck (DMP, 1988)
 Maureen McGovern, Naughty Baby (CBS Masterworks, 1989)
 Peggy Lee Sings the Blues (1989)
 Peggy Lee, Musicmasters Jazz Sampler (Musicmasters, 1989)
 Peggy Lee, There Will Never Be Another Spring (1990)
 Maureen McGovern, Gershwin (1990)
 Love Songs (Sony, 1992)
 LaVerne Butler Daydreamin (Chesky, 1992)
 Rodney Jones, The Unspoken Heart (1992)
 Christmas Songs (Milestone, 1993)
 Smooth Jazz Slow Jams (1993)
 Peggy Lee, Love Held Lightly Songs of Harold Arlen (1993)
 Ruth Brown, Songs of My Life (Fantasy, 1993)
 Best of Chesky Classics (Chesky, 1994)
 Larry Coryell, I'll Be Over You (CTI, 1994)
 Rhymes and Fables, Cab Calloway, Freddie Hubbard (1995)
 Kiss of the Spiderwoman, Original Cast Recording (1995)
 LaVerne Butler, No Lookin' Back (Chesky, 1994)
 Chesky Records Collection No. 1 (1995)
 Larry Coryell, Sketches of Coryell (Shanachie, 1996)
 Boys Next Door (1996)
 In and Out Original Soundtrack (1997)
 Steel Pier (Original Cast Recording) (1997)
 Julian Coryell, Duality (N2K, 1997)
 Michael Bolton, All That Matters (1997)
 The Lion King (Original Soundtrack) (1997)
 Hercules (Original Soundtrack) (1998)
 Gloria Lynne, This One's on Me (HighNote, 1998)
 Armageddon, Aerosmith (Original Soundtrack) (1999)
 Footloose (Broadway Cast Album) (1999)
 Rodney Jones, Undiscovered Few (Blue Note, 1999)
 Scott Hesse, Flame Within a Fire (2000)
 Larry Coryell, New High (HighNote, 2000)
 The Prime Gig (Original Soundtrack (2000)
 The Score (Original Soundtrack) (2001)
 Ronny Jordan, Off the Record (2001)
 The Rookie (Original Soundtrack) (2002)
 Two Weeks Notice Original Soundtrack (2002)
 Liza Minnelli, Liza's Back (2002)
 Blue Voices, The Finest in Jazz Ballads (2003)
 Mary Fahl, The Other Side of Time (CBS, 2003)
 DJ Spinna, Here to There (2003)
 Intolerable Cruelty Original Soundtrack (2003)
 David Chesky's Surround Sound Show (2004)
 Ronny Jordan, After 8 (Blue Note, 2004)
 The Alamo (Original Soundtrack) (2004)
 Ann Hampton Callaway, Slow (Shanachie, 2004)
 Miss Congeniality Original Soundtrack (2004)
 Miss Congeniality 2 (2005)
 Last Holiday Soundtrack (2005)
 Cheryl Wheeler, Defying Gravity (CBS Masterworks, 2005)
 The Light and the Piazza (Broadway Cast Album) (2005)
 Failure to Launch Original Soundtrack (2006)
 See What I Wanna See (Broadway Cast Album) (2006)
 Lena Horne, Seasons of a Life (Blue Note 2006)
 The Last Mimzy (Original Soundtrack) (2006)
 Jennifer Holiday (2008)
 Manure (Original Soundtrack (2008)
 Capathia Jenkins, Louis Rosen (PS Classics, 2009)
 Erin McDougald, Outside the Soiree
 Dan Block, From His World to Mine (Miles High, 2010)
 Jerry Costanza, Can't We Be Friends (Daywood Drive, 2011)
 Eddie Mendenhall, Cosign Meets Tangent (Miles High, 2011)
 Andy Farber, Big Band (2010)
 Tim Horner, The Places We Feel Free (Miles High, 2012)
 Dan Block, Duality (Miles High, 2012)
 Tim Hegarty, Tribute (Miles High, 2014)
 Laura Perlman, Precious Moments (Miles High, 2016)

As a producer
 Dan Block, From His World to Mine (Miles High, 2010)
 Eddie Mendenhall, Cosign Meets Tangent (Miles High, 2011)
 Dan Block, Duality (Miles High, 2013)
 Tim Hegarty, Tribute (Miles High, 2014)
 Laura Perlman, Precious Moments (Miles High, 2016)

Singles 
 "Changes in My Life"

Bibliography 
 Skills for the Poetic Language of Jazz Improvisation, with School and Career Guidance (Miles High Music Books), 2015

References

1957 births
American jazz drummers
American jazz pianists
American male pianists
Juilliard School faculty
Living people
New Jersey City University faculty
Chesky Records artists
The High School of Music & Art alumni
20th-century American drummers
American male drummers
20th-century American pianists
Jazz musicians from New York (state)
21st-century American pianists
20th-century American male musicians
21st-century American male musicians
American male jazz musicians
American jazz vibraphonists